The Phantom of the Opera is a 2004 musical romantic drama film based on Andrew Lloyd Webber's 1986 musical of the same name, which in turn is based on the 1910 French novel Le Fantôme de l'Opéra by Gaston Leroux. Produced and co-written by Lloyd Webber and directed by Joel Schumacher, it stars Gerard Butler in the title role, with Emmy Rossum, Patrick Wilson, Miranda Richardson, Minnie Driver, and Jennifer Ellison in supporting roles.

The film was announced in 1989, although production did not start until 2002 due to Lloyd Webber's divorce and Schumacher's busy career. It was shot entirely at Pinewood Studios, with scenery created with miniatures and computer graphics. Rossum, Wilson and Driver had singing experience, but Butler had none and was provided with music lessons prior to filming. The Phantom of the Opera grossed $154.6 million worldwide, and received neutral reviews from critics, but was well-received by audiences. Critics praised the visuals and acting, particularly the performances of Butler and Rossum, but criticized the writing, directing and unnecessary deviations from the stage version.

Plot
In 1919, a public auction was held to clear a dilapidated Paris opera house's vaults. The elderly Viscount Raoul de Chagny bids against Madame Giry, the retired ballet instructor of the theatre, for a papier-mâché music box shaped like a barrel organ with the figure of a cymbal-playing monkey, attached to it. The auctioneer presents a repaired chandelier, relating it to "the strange affair of the Phantom of the Opera". As it is hoisted up to the roof, the story moves back to 1870.

The theatre prepares for the performance of the grand opera Hannibal, headed by a soprano, Carlotta Giudicelli. One of the dancers, Christine Daaé, recognizes Raoul as a childhood sweetheart and wonders if he will also acknowledge her, but he leaves without seeing her. Theatre manager Monsieur Lefèvre plans to retire, leaving the theatre under the ownership of Richard Firmin and Gilles André, who introduce their patron, the young Raoul.

Carlotta refuses to perform after being tormented for three years by the theatre's resident "Opera Ghost", a mysterious figure said to live in the catacombs below. Facing the performance's cancellation, Madame Giry suggests that Christine be the lead actress. Christine displays her singing talent and is a massive success on opening night.

Christine tells her best friend Meg, Giry's daughter, that she is being coached by a tutor she calls the "Angel of Music". Christine reunites with Raoul, in whom she confides that she has been visited by the Angel of Music her deceased father promised he would send her after his death. Raoul, however, dismisses Christine's story. That night, the masked Opera Ghost, known as the "Phantom", appears before Christine from her dressing room mirror, spiriting her to his underground lair. After the Phantom shows Christine a mannequin of her dressed in a wedding dress he made for her, Christine faints and sleeps in the Phantom's lair. This point presumes that Christine has been missing.

Once Christine awakes and sees the Phantom, she removes his mask out of curiosity. The Phantom reacts violently and covers his face with his hand. After the duo has a moment of understanding, Christine returns the front to the Phantom, and the latter then returns her to the theatre unharmed but orders the managers to make her the lead in Il Muto. However, the managers choose Carlotta instead. During the performance, the Phantom switches Carlotta's throat spray, causing her to sing out of tune, and Christine replaces her. The Phantom encounters stagehand Joseph Buquet and hangs him above the stage. Christine and Raoul flee to the roof, declaring their love for each other. The Phantom, now heartbroken after witnessing the whole scene, vows revenge.

Three months later, in 1871, Christine and Raoul announced their engagement at a New Year masquerade ball. The Phantom crashes the ball and orders his opera, Don Juan Triumphant, to be performed. Upon seeing Christine's engagement ring, the Phantom steals it and flees, pursued by Raoul, but Giry stops him. Giry explains that when she was younger, she met the Phantom, a deformed young boy, billed in a freak show and abused by the owner. When the Phantom rebelled and strangled the owner to death, Giry helped him evade the resulting mob and hid him within the opera house. The next day, Christine visits her father's tomb with the Phantom posing as his spirit to win her back, but Raoul intervenes. The Phantom and Raoul duel with each other before Raoul eventually knocks the Phantom down and flees with Christine.

Raoul and the managers plan to capture the Phantom during his opera. The Phantom murders the lead tenor, Ubaldo Piangi, and takes his place to sing with Christine. Christine unmasks the Phantom during their passionate duet, revealing his deformity to the horrified audience. The Phantom then abducts Christine and retreats as he causes the chandelier to crash and sets the opera house on fire to cover his tracks, but a mob forms to hunt him down with the police. Giry leads Raoul to the Phantom's lair to rescue Christine, while Meg also leads the pack.

The Phantom has Christine wear the wedding dress and proposes marriage. Christine tries to reason with him by admitting that she only fears his malicious acts, not his appearance. When Raoul arrives, the Phantom threatens to kill him unless Christine weds him. Pitying the Phantom, Christine kisses him. Moved by her kindness, the Phantom allows the lovers to leave. Comforted by the music box, the Phantom weeps alone, and Christine lets him keep her engagement ring to remember her by. He then escapes before the mob and the police arrive, with Meg finding only his discarded mask. In the present, Raoul visits the recently deceased Christine's grave and places the Phantom's music box before it. Before leaving, he notices a freshly laid rose with Christine's ring attached to its stem, implying that the Phantom is still alive and will always love her.

Cast
 Gerard Butler as The Phantom
 Emmy Rossum as Christine Daaé 
 Patrick Wilson as Raoul de Chagny
 Miranda Richardson as Madame Giry
 Minnie Driver as Carlotta Giudicelli
 Margaret Preece as Carlotta's singing voice except for "Learn to Be Lonely"
 Simon Callow as Gilles André
 Ciarán Hinds as Richard Firmin
 Victor McGuire as Ubaldo Piangi
 Jennifer Ellison as Meg Giry
 Murray Melvin as Monsieur Reyer
 Kevin McNally as Joseph Buquet
 James Fleet as Monsieur Lefèvre
 Ramin Karimloo as Gustave Daaé

Production

Development
Warner Bros. purchased the film rights to The Phantom of the Opera in early 1989, granting Andrew Lloyd Webber total artistic control. Despite interest from A-list directors, Lloyd Webber and Warner Bros. instantly hired Joel Schumacher to direct; Lloyd Webber had been impressed with Schumacher's use of music in The Lost Boys. The duo wrote the screenplay that same year, while Michael Crawford and Sarah Brightman were cast to reprise their roles from the original stage production. Filming was set to begin at Pinewood Studios in England in July 1990, under a $25 million budget.

However, the start date was pushed to November 1990 at both Babelsberg Studios in Potsdam, Germany and Barrandov Studios in Prague, Czech Republic. Production for The Phantom of the Opera was stalled with Lloyd Webber and Brightman's divorce. "Everything got tied up in settlements", Schumacher reflected. "Then my career took off and I was really busy." As a result, The Phantom of the Opera languished in development limbo for Warner Bros. throughout the 1990s. In February 1997, Schumacher considered returning, but eventually dropped out in favour of Batman Unchained, Runaway Jury and Dreamgirls. The studio was keen to cast John Travolta for the lead role, but also held discussions with Antonio Banderas, who undertook vocal preparation and sang the role of the Phantom in the TV special Andrew Lloyd Webber: The Royal Albert Hall Celebration.

Schumacher and Lloyd Webber restarted development for The Phantom of the Opera in December 2002. It was then announced in January 2003 that Lloyd Webber's Really Useful Group had purchased the film rights from Warner Bros. in an attempt to produce The Phantom of the Opera independently. As a result, Lloyd Webber invested $6 million of his own money. The Phantom of the Opera was produced on an $80 million budget. Warner Bros. was given a first-look deal for distribution; when the principal cast was chosen in June 2003, Warner Bros. paid under $8 million to acquire the North American distribution rights.

Casting
Hugh Jackman was among those considered for the role of Phantom, but he faced scheduling conflicts with Van Helsing. "They rang to ask about my availability", Jackman explained in an April 2003 interview, "probably about 20 other actors as well. I wasn't available, unfortunately. So, that was a bummer." "We needed somebody who has a bit of rock and roll sensibility in him", Andrew Lloyd Webber explained. "He's got to be a bit rough, a bit dangerous; not a conventional singer. Christine is attracted to the Phantom because he's the right side of danger." Director Joel Schumacher had been impressed with Gerard Butler's performance in Dracula 2000. Prior to his audition, Butler had no professional singing experience and had only taken four voice lessons before singing "The Music of the Night" for Lloyd Webber.

Katie Holmes, who began working with a vocal coach, was the front-runner for Christine Daaé in March 2003. She was later replaced by Anne Hathaway, a classically trained soprano, in 2004. However, Hathaway dropped out of the role because the production schedule of the film overlapped with The Princess Diaries 2: Royal Engagement, which she was contractually obligated to make. Hathaway was then replaced with Emmy Rossum. The actress modeled the relationship between the Phantom and Christine after Suzanne Farrell and George Balanchine. Patrick Wilson was cast as Raoul based on his previous Broadway theatre career. For the role of Carlotta, Minnie Driver devised an over-the-top, camp performance as the egotistical prima donna. Despite also lacking singing experience, Ciarán Hinds was cast by Schumacher as Richard Firmin; the two had previously worked together on Veronica Guerin. Ramin Karimloo, who later played the Phantom as well as Raoul on London's West End,  briefly appears as the portrait of Gustave Daaé, Christine's father.

Filming
Principal photography lasted from 15 September 2003 to 15 January 2004. The film was shot entirely using eight sound stages at Pinewood Studios, where, on the Pinewood backlot, the bottom half exterior of the opera was constructed. The top half was implemented using a combination of computer-generated imagery (CGI) and a scale model created by Cinesite. The surrounding Paris skyline for "All I Ask of You" was entirely composed of matte paintings. Cinesite also created a miniature falling chandelier, since a life-size model was too big for the actual set.

Production designer Anthony D. G. Pratt was influenced by French architect Charles Garnier, designer of the original Paris opera house, as well as Edgar Degas, John Singer Sargent, Gustave Caillebotte, the Pre-Raphaelite Brotherhood and Dante Gabriel Rossetti. Schumacher was inspired by Jean Cocteau's Beauty and the Beast (1946), where a hallway is lined with arms holding candelabra. The cemetery was based on the Père Lachaise and Montparnasse. Costume designer Alexandra Byrne utilized a limited black, white, gold and silver color palette for the Masquerade ball in spite of the lyrics being sung indicating that it is a multicolored affair in which mauve, puce, green, and black amongst others are on display.

Reception

Release
The Phantom of the Opera was released in the United Kingdom on 10 December 2004 and the United States on 22 December 2004. With a limited release of 622 theaters, it opened at tenth place at the weekend box office, grossing $6.5 million across five days. After expanding to 907 screens on 14 January 2005 the film obtained the 9th spot at the box office, which it retained during its 1,511 screens wide release on 21 January 2005. The total domestic gross was $51.2 million. With a further $107 million earned internationally, The Phantom of the Opera reached a worldwide total of $154.6 million. A few foreign markets were particularly successful, such as Japan, where the film's ¥4.20 billion ($35 million) gross stood as the 6th most successful foreign film and 9th overall of the year. The United Kingdom and South Korea both had over $10 million in receipts, with $17.5 million and $11.9 million, respectively.

Accolades 
Anthony Pratt and Celia Bobak were nominated for the Academy Award for Best Art Direction, as was John Mathieson for Best Cinematography. However, both categories were awarded to The Aviator. Andrew Lloyd Webber and lyricist Charles Hart were nominated for the Academy Award for Best Original Song ("Learn to Be Lonely") but lost to "Al otro lado del río" from The Motorcycle Diaries. The song was also nominated for the Golden Globe but it lost to Alfie's "Old Habits Die Hard". In the same ceremony, Emmy Rossum was nominated for Best Actress in a Motion Picture Musical or Comedy, losing to Annette Bening in Being Julia. At the Saturn Awards, Rossum won for Best Performance by a Younger Actor, while The Phantom of the Opera was nominated for Best Action/Adventure/Thriller Film and Alexandra Byrne was nominated for Costume Design.

Critical reception
On the review aggregator website Rotten Tomatoes, the film has an approval rating of 33%, based on reviews from 171 critics, with an average score of 5.01/10. The site's critical consensus reads: "The music of the night has hit something of a sour note: critics are calling the screen adaptation of Andrew Lloyd Webber's popular musical histrionic, boring and lacking in both romance and danger. Still, some have praised the film for its sheer spectacle." On Metacritic it has a weighted average score of 40 out of 100 based on 39 reviews, indicating "mixed or average reviews". Audiences polled by CinemaScore gave the film an average grade of "A" on an A+ to F scale.

Despite having been impressed with the cast, Jonathan Rosenbaum of the Chicago Reader wrote that "Teen romance and operetta-style singing replace the horror elements familiar to film-goers, and director Joel Schumacher obscures any remnants of classy stage spectacle with the same disco overkill he brought to Batman Forever." Stephanie Zacharek of Salon.com believed that Phantom of the Opera "takes everything that's wrong with Broadway and puts it on the big screen in a gaudy splat."

In a mixed review for Newsweek, David Ansen praised Rossum's performance, but criticized the filmmakers for their focus on visual design rather than presenting a cohesive storyline. "Its kitschy romanticism bored me on Broadway and it bores me here—I may not be the most reliable witness. Still, I can easily imagine a more dashing, charismatic Phantom than Butler's. Rest assured, however, Lloyd Webber's neo-Puccinian songs are reprised and reprised and reprised until you're guaranteed to go out humming." Owen Gleiberman of Entertainment Weekly believed Schumacher did not add enough dimension in adapting The Phantom of the Opera. "Schumacher, the man who added nipples to Batman's suit, has staged Phantom chastely, as if his job were to adhere the audience to every note".

Roger Ebert, who gave the film three stars out of four, reasoned that "part of the pleasure of movie-going is pure spectacle—of just sitting there and looking at great stuff and knowing it looks terrific. There wasn't much Schumacher could have done with the story or the music he was handed, but in the areas over which he held sway, he has triumphed." In contrasting between the popularity of the Broadway musical, Michael Dequina of Film Threat magazine explained that "it conjures up this unexplainable spell that leaves audiences sad, sentimental, swooning, smiling—in some way transported and moved. Now, in Schumacher's film, that spell lives on."

In a 2013 interview with Hollywood.com, Cameron Mackintosh, a co-producer on the stage musical who had nothing to do with this movie, said "I would have wanted to do the film differently. This new version which we’ve done (a touring production with reimagined staging) is dangerous and gritty. It combines the world of upstage and the lair below. You see two different worlds. That would have been my approach to the film." In a 2021 interview with Variety, Andrew Lloyd Webber revealed that he personally felt director Joel Schumacher made a mistake in casting Gerard Butler. He said "The Phantom was too young, and the whole point of the Phantom is he needs to be quite a bit older than Christine."

See also
 The Phantom of the Opera (2004 soundtrack)

References

External links

 
 
 
 
 
 

2004 films
2004 romantic drama films
British musical films
British romantic drama films
Films about opera
Films based on adaptations
Films based on multiple works
Films based on musicals
Films based on The Phantom of the Opera
Films directed by Joel Schumacher
Films with screenplays by Joel Schumacher
Films partially in color
Films set in Paris
Films set in the 1870s
Films set in 1870
Films set in 1871
Films set in 1919
2000s English-language films
American historical romance films
British nonlinear narrative films
American nonlinear narrative films
Films shot at Pinewood Studios
Warner Bros. films
Odyssey Entertainment films
Musicals by Andrew Lloyd Webber
2000s American films
2000s British films